The online Virtual Museum of Modern Nigerian Art is a non-commercial initiative whose primary aim is to provide an easily accessible educational resource that can serve as a first point of reference for students, teachers and art enthusiasts interested in learning about modern and contemporary art in Nigeria. It is operated by the Pan-Atlantic University in Lagos, Nigeria, the parent body of the Lagos Business School.

History
The virtual museum went live in the second quarter of 2011, although preliminary work had already started. The initiative was by Jess Castellote, a Spanish architect, and the Virtual museum is managed by Akinyemi Adetunji. It has four virtual floors and over a dozen gallery rooms, each of which is dedicated to a specific period or to a given school.

The virtual museum complements the Nigerian National Museum, opened in 1957 in the city of Lagos. While the National Museum has an excellent collection that includes works from 900–200 BC, it lacks contemporary work; the virtual museum fills this gap.
Castellote has said that he hopes the virtual museum will help unknown Nigerian artists who have produced great works to become better known. He acknowledges that there may be problems, such as ensuring authenticity and accuracy of information, but describes the site as a work in progress that will constantly evolve and improve.

The Virtual Museum of Modern Nigerian Art was discontinued following the opening of the Yemisi Shyllon Museum of Art (YSMA) of the Pan-Atlantic University. The YSMA plans to integrate the project into the museum’s YSMA’s digital resources. Since its inception in 2011, the Virtual Museum has been hosted on the Pan-Atlantic University (at that time still called Pan-African University) website. The Pan-Atlantic University has always had an appreciation for art and maintained a practice of making art integral to life within the university. Due to this interest, PAU had already been gathering art works from contemporary Nigerian artists thus leading to the need for the university to have its own art museum. The Pan-Atlantic University was able to build the first ever university art museum in Nigeria thanks to the support of Prince Yemisi Shyllon.

Collection

The interactive website features about 800 works from different artists, including pioneering Nigerian artists such as Aina Onabolu and Bruce Onobrakpeya, and emerging artists such as Richardson Ovbiebo and Babalola Lawson.

Some of the objects are held in private collections and are on public display for the first time.

Structure

The sections of the website resemble rooms and are modelled after major art schools and styles in Nigeria, with the exception of a few rooms dedicated to masters like Ben Enwinwu and Bruce Onobrakpeya, an octogenarian print artist. Featured in the virtual museum are approximately 80 artists, randomly distributed among the rooms. The list is subjective, though prominence and impact on contemporary Nigerian art is a yardstick employed in the selection. The Virtual Museum started small, but plans to build into one of the top educational resources on Nigerian art. The virtual museum will help disseminate and add to the body of existing knowledge on contemporary art in Nigeria. The artwork online are spread to accommodate all themes, styles and type of works (painting, sculpture, materialism, etc.) with major focus currently centred on painting and sculpture. The Virtual Museum is working with Nigerian artists and collectors to pool these works. For protection of artists’ and collectors’ rights, all reproductions/representations of artwork identify the artist who created them and the collection the works belong to; moreover, these artworks are reproduced in low resolution (72 dpi) so as to render them of little commercial use. Adequate consent and permission is requested before works are displayed. The website also provides external links to articles, papers, journals, or other domains providing added information on a subject or artist; this helps users gain a rounded knowledge.

See also
 Virtual museums
 National Gallery of Modern Art, Lagos
 Culture of Nigeria
Yemisi Shyllon Museum of Art
https://museum.pau.edu.ng/explore/virtual-tour

References

2011 establishments in Nigeria
Internet properties established in 2011
Virtual art museums and galleries
Art museums and galleries in Nigeria
Pan-Atlantic University
Nigerian educational websites